Choi Soo-jin (Hangul: 최수진; born July 5, 1979), better known by her stage name Horan (Hangul: 호란) is a South Korean singer and actress. She is the female vocalist of the South Korean electropop band Clazziquai that was formed in 2001 and debuted in 2004 with the album Instant Pig. She is also the vocalist of the rock band Ibadi.

Biography

Early life
Horan was born in South Korea on July 5, 1979. She attended Yonsei University, where she studied French language and literature, and majored in psychology.

In July 2016, Horan revealed on SBS's The Genius Scouters that she had been bullied in high school.

Personal life
On March 30, 2013, at Seoul Gangnam Renaissance Hotel, Horan married an IT technician who she had dated in college. Fluxus announced that the couple had divorced in July 2016 after three years of marriage.

On September 29, 2016, at around 6 am, Horan rammed a cleaning truck on Seongsu Bridge in Seoul while on her way to host her daily morning radio show on SBS Power FM. The driver of the truck was taken to hospital for minor injuries, while Horan was booked by Seoul Gangnam Police without arrest on a DUI charge. Horan's blood-alcohol level was found to be 0.106 percent, high enough to have her driving license revoked. Horan had previously been booked for DUI charges in 2004 and 2007 making this her third. The case was sent to the Prosecutor in October. Fluxus released an official statement regarding the charge, apologising and halting all of Horan's activities. On January 9, 2017, Horan was fined ₩7 million ($5,800), taking into account Horan's out-of-court settlement with the injured truck driver.

Discography

Extended plays

Singles

Collaborations

Soundtrack appearances

Filmography

Film

Drama

Entertainment

Radio

References

External links
 

1979 births
Living people
K-pop singers
South Korean women pop singers
South Korean electronic musicians
South Korean female idols
South Korean television actresses
South Korean women television presenters
South Korean radio presenters
Yonsei University alumni
21st-century South Korean women singers
South Korean women radio presenters
Clazziquai Project members